Wang Sam Mo is a district (amphoe) in southeastern Udon Thani province, northeastern Thailand.

Geography
Neighboring districts are (from the west clockwise) Si That and Chai Wan of Udon Thani Province, Waritchaphum, Nikhom Nam Un, and Kut Bak of Sakon Nakhon province and Kham Muang, Sam Chai, and Nong Kung Si and Tha Khantho of Kalasin province.

History
The minor district (king amphoe) Wang Sam Mo was established on 1 October 1975, when the three tambons Nong Kung Thap Ma, Ba Yao, and Nong Ya Sai were split off from Si That district. It was upgraded to a full district on 13 July 1981.

Administration
The district is divided into six sub-districts (tambons), which are further subdivided into 72 villages (mubans). Wang Sam Mo is a sub-district municipality (thesaban tambon) which covers parts of tambon Wang Sam Mo. Phasuk is a sub-district municipality which covers the whole same-named tambon. There are a further five tambon administrative organizations (TAO).

References

External links
amphoe.com

Wang Sam Mo